The Hennessy Tournament was an Irish golf tournament played from 1957 to 1965. Christy O'Connor Snr won the event 5 times between 1957 and 1963. The event was sponsored by Hennessy, a cognac distiller.

History
Total prize money was £500 in 1957, 500 guineas in 1958, 1960 and 1961, 750 guineas in 1962 and 1963 and £1,500 in 1965. In 1964 Hennessy sponsored a round-robin event, the Hennessy Round-robin Tournament which had prize money of £1,500.

Winners

References

Golf tournaments in Ireland
Recurring sporting events established in 1957
Recurring sporting events disestablished in 1965
1957 establishments in Ireland
1965 disestablishments in Ireland